Fatty acid desaturase 1 is an enzyme that in humans is encoded by the FADS1 gene.

Function 

The protein encoded by the FADS1 gene is a member of the fatty acid desaturase (FADS) gene family and desaturates omega-3 and omega-6 polyunsaturated fatty acids at the delta-5 position, catalyzing the final step in the formation of eicosapentaenoic acid (EPA) and Arachidonic acid. Desaturase enzymes (such as those encoded by FADS1) regulate unsaturation of fatty acids through the introduction of double bonds between defined carbons of the fatty acyl chain. FADS family members are considered fusion products composed of an N-terminal cytochrome b5-like domain and a C-terminal multiple membrane-spanning desaturase portion, both of which are characterized by conserved histidine motifs. This gene is clustered with family members FADS1 and FADS2 at 11q12-q13.1; this cluster is thought to have arisen evolutionarily from gene duplication based on its similar exon/intron organization.

Clinical significance 
Single nucleotide polymorphisms (SNPs) of FADS1 and FADS2 may affect long-chain polyunsaturated fatty acids (LC-PUFA) metabolism and have a potential role in the development of atopic diseases.

References

Further reading

EC 1.14.19